The men's 5000 meter at the 2013 KNSB Dutch Single Distance Championships took place in Heerenveen at the Thialf ice skating rink on Friday 9 November 2012. Although this tournament was held in 2012 it was part of the speed skating season 2012–2013.There were 20 participants.

Statistics

Result

Source:

Draw

References

Single Distance Championships
2013 Single Distance